The Nakajima D3N (also designated Experimental 11-Shi Carrier Bomber and Nakajima DB) was a Japanese carrier-based dive bomber of the 1930s. Three prototypes were built for the Imperial Japanese Navy, but no production followed, with the Aichi D3A being selected instead.

Design and development
In 1936, the Imperial Japanese Navy Air Service issued a specification for a carrier based dive bomber to replace the Aichi D1A, a two-seat biplane developed from the German Heinkel He 66. The new dive bomber was to be a low-wing monoplane, with proposals submitted by Aichi, Mitsubishi and Nakajima. Orders were placed with Aichi and Nakajima for prototypes in 1934. Nakajima's design was based on its C3N  and B5N that had been designed to meet 1935 requirements for a reconnaissance aircraft and torpedo bomber respectively, and like these aircraft, was a single-engined monoplane of all-metal construction with folding wings for storage aboard ship. It had a retractable tailwheel undercarriage, in which the mainwheels were designed to be lowered for use as dive brakes, although more conventional dive brakes were added as a result of a change in the specification.

The first prototype made its maiden flight in 1937, with the second and third prototypes flying in 1939. Aichi's AM-17 proved superior however, and was ordered into production as the Aichi D3A in December 1939.

The second prototype was retained by Nakajima and used as a testbed, helping in the development of the Nakajima Sakae and Homare engines, and remaining in use until 1945.

Specifications

See also

Notes

References

Carrier-based aircraft
1930s Japanese attack aircraft
D3N